The Diocese of Christ the King is a diocese of the Anglican Church of Southern Africa in the southern part of Gauteng province, South Africa.

The Diocese Of Christ The King Has Four archdeaconries Namely The Archdeaconary Of St Peter, Archdeaconary Of Kliprivier, Archdeaconary Of Sebokeng With Evaton And Archdeaconary Of The Vaal.

History
The diocese was founded in 1990. It comprises Sharpeville, Vereeniging, Boipatong, Vanderbijlpark, Sebokeng and the southern side of the city of Johannesburg in South Africa.

The diocese is the area between the Vaal Triangle—where Sharpeville, Vereeniging, Boipatong, Vanderbijlpark and Sebokeng are found—and the southern side of the city of Johannesburg in South Africa. Just over half of these churches have a recognisable church building in which to worship. The rest meet in garages, shacks or the open air. One of the latest new congregations worships in French and aims to welcome refugees from the Congo and other Francophone African countries.
 
The diocese has links of varying degrees of formality with the Episcopal Diocese of Virginia (ECUSA), the Diocese of Bujumbura, the Diocese of Mauritius, the Church of North India and the Church of South India. The Diocese of Christ the King is part of the Community of the Cross of Nails. Locally, the diocese enjoys a close relationship with the Anglican Diocese of St Mark the Evangelist, with youth from Christ Church, Polokwane, and elsewhere, attending the "A re roriseng - Let us worship" conference each year in Rosettenville.

List of bishops
 Peter Lee 1990–2016.
 William Mostert was named by the synod of bishops of the Anglican Church of Southern Africa as the bishop-elect and has since been consecrated and enthroned.

Coat of arms 
The diocese registered a coat of arms at the Bureau of Heraldry in 1990 : Azure, a Chrismon Argent ensigned with a celestial crown Or;  the shield ensigned with a mitre proper.

References

External links
 

1990 establishments in South Africa
Anglican Church of Southern Africa dioceses
Anglican bishops of Christ the King